Ricardo Milillo (born 19 September 1969) is a Venezuelan footballer. He played in eight matches for the Venezuela national football team in 1993. He was also part of Venezuela's squad for the 1993 Copa América tournament.

References

External links
 

1969 births
Living people
Venezuelan footballers
Venezuela international footballers
Place of birth missing (living people)
Association football midfielders
Estudiantes de Mérida players